John Alexander Carfrae (1868–1947) was a Scottish architect of particular note in the field of innovative school design. He was considered one of the best architects of his generation, but his works were rather limited as he was constrained to the standard board school formats.

Life

Born in Edinburgh the son of Thomas Carfrae, a civil engineer. He was the younger brother of George Somervil Carfae, also a civil engineer. The family lived at 9 Osborne Terrace in Edinburgh's West End. He was educated at James Gillespie's High School.

Carfrae was articled in 1881 to Robert Wilson, architect for the Edinburgh School Board. In 1889 he moved to London to be an assistant to Arthur Cawston, but transferred to HM Office of Works to work under Henry Tanner. In June 1892 Carfrae returned to Edinburgh to work in Sydney Mitchell and Robert Wilson's practice. Six months later, Carfrae became Wilson's principal assistant and he took over most design work.

When Robert Wilson died in 1901, Carfrae inherited both his office and the full role as architect to the Edinburgh School Board. In 1918 local government practices changed, and the City Architect became responsible for school design, resulting in Carfrae losing his practice. However, the city architect Ebenezer James MacRae still passed him two commissions: for Balgreen and Stenhouse schools.

From 1907 until death he lived in Polwarth, Edinburgh, at 3 Gillsland Road. He lived here with his wife, Augusta Wilkes Henderson, and their two sons. Carfrae retired completely in 1939. He died on 11 July 1947.

Works
Carfrae worked largely for the Edinburgh School Board. Even before he completely took control of this design function, his style is clear, acting as Chief Assistant within the office.

Bruntsfield Primary School, Montpelier, Edinburgh (1893-5)
James Gillespie's High School Annexe, Upper Gilmore Place, Edinburgh (1895)
Villas, 18,20 Inverleith Place, Edinburgh (1897) (uncharacteristically plain)
Flora Stevenson School, Comely Bank, Edinburgh (1899-1900)
Craiglockhart Primary School (1901)
Original Boroughmuir High School, Warrender Park Crescent, Edinburgh (1902)
Broughton Primary School Annexe (1902)
Broughton School Annexe, McDonald Road, Edinburgh (1903)
Albion Road School (built as Leith Academy Annexe) (1903)
Office, 5 St Andrew Square, Edinburgh (1903, demolished 2014)
Drummond Street School (built as St. Patrick’s RC School), Edinburgh (1905)
Colinton Cottage Homes (for the Church of Scotland, Aged Christian Friendly Society), Redford Road and Thorburn Road, Colinton (1906-7)
Dirleton School (1910)
Juniper Green Primary School (1910)
Duncan Street Special School, Edinburgh (1910)
Tynecastle High School, Edinburgh (1910–11)
Boroughmuir High School, Viewforth, Edinburgh (1911) (sculpture by Joseph Hayes)
Tollcross School, Edinburgh (1911)
Remodelling of Cannonball House on the Royal Mile as a school (1913)
St Thomas Aquinas School (also known as King’s Park School or St. Leonard’s School), Edinburgh (1913)
Newton School, West Lothian (1914)
School War Memorial, George Watson’s College (1920)
Drummond Community High School (Bellevue School), Edinburgh (1923)
Hawick High School (1926)
Stenhouse Primary School, Edinburgh (1929)

References

Who's Who in Architecture 1914

1868 births
1947 deaths
Architects from Edinburgh